The 2018 Coupe de la Ligue Final decided the winner of the 2017–18 Coupe de la Ligue, the 24th season of France's football league cup competition, the Coupe de la Ligue, a competition for the 42 teams that the Ligue de Football Professionnel (LFP) manages. The final took place on 31 March 2018 at the Nouveau Stade de Bordeaux in Bordeaux and was contested by reigning champions Paris Saint-Germain and Monaco, a rematch of the previous final.

Paris Saint-Germain won the final 3–0 for their 5th consecutive and 8th overall Coupe de la Ligue title.

Route to the final
Note: In all results below, the score of the finalist is given first (H: home; A: away).

Match

Details

References

External links
 
 

2018
Cup
Paris Saint-Germain F.C. matches
AS Monaco FC matches
Sport in Bordeaux
March 2018 sports events in France